No Sleep at All is the debut studio album by Canadian indie pop band Creature, released on March 3, 2008. "Pop Culture" is the first single released from the album.

Track listing
"Who's Hot Who's Not"
"Don't Be Afraid" 
"Pop Culture"
"Brigitte Bardot"
"Alive"
"Pay Up"
"Property" 
"Kandahar"
"(Last Days Of) America"
"It's Over"
"Star"

References

External links
review at anevibe.com

2008 debut albums
Creature (band) albums